Yoav Regional Council (Mo'atza Azorit Yoav) is a regional council in the Southern District of Israel. It is located near the cities of Kiryat Gat, Kiryat Malakhi and Ashkelon. It was founded in 1952, covering an area of 230,000 dunams (230 km2), with a population of about 5,300.

The council is named after Yitzhak Dubnov, who was nicknamed "Yoav", and who fell while defending Negba in the 1947–1949 Palestine war. Operation Yoav and Metzudat Yoav, which is located in the council's area, are also named after him.

The council contains two parts which are not contiguous geographically. The main part is bordered on the north by Nahal Sorek Regional Council, on the west by Be'er Tuvia Regional Council and Shafir Regional Council, on the south by Lakhish Regional Council and Kiryat Gat, and on the east by Matte Yehuda Regional Council. The western portion of the council, which includes the kibbutzim Negba and Sde Yoav, is bordered on the north and east by Shafir Regional Council, on the west by Hof Ashkelon Regional Council, and on the west by Lakhish Regional Council.

Communities in the council
Today the council has 8 kibbutzim, 3 moshavim, a youth village, a community settlement, and an Arab village.

The immediate past mayor of the Yoav Regional Council is Rani Traynin from Beit Nir.  Mr. Traynin resigned his position as mayor to become the Vice Chairman of the Executive of the Jewish Agency for Israel. He was succeeded by Matti Sarfati Harkavi, the first woman ever elected Mayor of the Yoav Regional Council.  She is from moshav Sgula and is a noted plant geneticist.  For several years she served as the Yoav Chairperson of the Partnership 2000 Committee, linking the Yoav Regional Council with the Jewish community of the Lehigh Valley based in Allentown, Pennsylvania.

The government offices are located at Re'em Junction.

Kibbutzim
Beit Nir
Beit Guvrin
Gal On
Gat
Kfar Menachem
Negba
Revadim
Sde Yoav

Moshavim
Kfar HaRif
Nahla
Sgula

Youth village
Kedma

Community settlement
Vardon

Arab village
al-'Azi

External links
Official website 

 
Regional councils in Israel
1953 establishments in Israel